Season One is the second studio album by Canadian rapper Saukrates, released April 24, 2012. It was released independently on FrostByte Media and eOne Music, 13 years after the release of his debut album The Underground Tapes. Singles from the album include "Drop It Down" and "Say I".

Background 
After signing a record deal with Def Jam Recordings in 2000, Saukrates began working on his second album, Bad Addiction, which was slated to be released in 2004. He was eventually dropped by Def Jam, and failed to secure another major-label deal for the album, which was shelved despite being completed. In 2006, Saukrates' group Big Black Lincoln released their debut album, Heaven's Caught on Fire, in Canada. The album showcased his R&B-style singing abilities, which later became common in his collaborations with other artists.

The album title, Season One, is a reference to what Saukrates calls "a wonderful new beginning" in his career. On the album, he delivers a unique rapping-singing combination, paired with diverse styles of production, including boom bap, electronic, and live instrumentation. The song "On the Run" (featuring k-os and Nelly Furtado) was previously released as "I Wish I Knew Natalie Portman", a single from k-os' 2009 album Yes!.

Reception 

RapReviews.com gave the album an 8/10 rating, stating "The self reflection and maturity of Season One clearly make it an overall effective album," also adding "In various songs Saukrates explores the triumphs and tragedies of life while remaining optimistic that better days are ahead."

Track listing

Samples
"On the Run" contains a sample of "California" by Phantom Planet

References 

2012 albums
Albums produced by Saukrates
E1 Music albums
Saukrates albums